The Peugeot 207 is a supermini car (B) that was designed and produced by the French automaker Peugeot from 2006 to 2014. It was presented at the Geneva Motor Show in 2006, and entered production in April 2006, as the successor to the Peugeot 206. It shares the same platform with the Citroën C3.

The Peugeot 207 was replaced in April 2012 by the Peugeot 208, which is built on the same platform.

Launch
The 207 was launched in France, Spain, and Italy during April 2006, and later on in other markets in Europe and the Middle East. In January 2004, Peugeot decided not to manufacture the 207 in Ryton. 

The launch for the United Kingdom was on 8 June 2006. Amicus and the TGWU, both unions representing workers at PSA's manufacturing plant in Ryton, Coventry, chose the same day to launch a campaign calling for the boycott of PSA's Peugeot and Citroën vehicles in the United Kingdom, to protest against the company's plans to close the plant. Peugeot's United Kingdom sales grew, despite the resulting boycott.

Prior to the launch, Peugeot launched a campaign for the 207 on MSN.

Design and specification

The 207 was the successor to the 206. The 207 was based on a modified version of the platform used for the Citroën C3 and was built in Poissy (France), Madrid (Spain) and a new plant in Trnava, Slovakia.

From the end of 2006, the 1.4 and 1.6 16v models were replaced by the new 1.4 vti  and 1.6 vti a  Valvetronic engines.

The 207 was available as a three- or five-door hatchback, a 207 SW station wagon and the 207 coupé cabriolet (207 CC), which was launched in December 2006, as a replacement for the ageing 206 CC retractable hardtop, with engine choice limited to either the 1.6l HDi or 1.6l Vti. 

A panel van 207 Van model was presented at the Commercial Vehicle Show in Birmingham, UK, and sold in the United Kingdom. The commercial 207 kept its side windows in most other markets, such as France, where it was marketed as 207 Affaire. 

A GTI (or RC in some markets) version was also available, with the THP175  turbocharged 1.6 litre engine. A GT (or Limitee) version is also available, but is only sold with the THP150  turbocharged 1.6 litre engine, and also features a glass roof. 

Both the GTI and GT versions are sold exclusively with manual gearboxes. The car was facelifted in July 2009, receiving a slightly smaller grille and revised front lighting, including new fog lamp housings, along with LED lights on the rear.

Le Mans Special Edition
After just securing the top three positions in qualifying for the 24 Hours of Le Mans endurance race, Peugeot had fittingly released details for a Peugeot 207 Le Mans Series special edition model. With only 2,000 units produced, the 207 Le Mans Series was distinguished on the outside with a sport front bumper with Shadow aluminium grille and Black Chrome headlights.

The body side moldings, bumpers strips, and side view mirror housings were painted body color, while a long racing stripe got trimmed along the bonnet, roof, and rear spoiler. Other decal accents included a Peugeot logo, striping on the doors and Le Mans logos on the liftgate. Also special multispoke 17 inch Pitlane aluminium wheels set the tone of the vehicle. Exterior colours were Banquise White and Obsidien Black.

Carried over from the 207 RC, the interior received  finish decor with front and rear bucket seats as well as RC front and rear mat covers. The steering wheel too, with a  finish ring and numbered from 1 to 2,000. The gearshift lever knob, pedal assembly, foot rest and door sill are in aluminium.

Three engines were available with the 207 Le Mans Series. Starting with the 1.6 HDi 16v 110 hp DPFS and 1.6 THP150 16v 150 hp engines each of which receive a chrome plated single exhaust pipe. The top 1.6 THP175 16v 175 hp received a chrome plated dual exhaust pipe.

Reception
The Peugeot 207 met with mixed reviews, facing criticism for the design of its interior, for the quality of its gearbox, and for its handling, with the latter two issues also identified in the GTI version.

Autocar magazine said the Peugeot 207 hatchback was "safely played and as such lacks charm, verve and difference". It did receive praise for its value, safety and styling. Reviewers feared that it would prove unreliable, and one car insurer named it the fourth least reliable vehicle. The CC version was better received, with Top Gear motoring magazine describing it as "a decent new version of one of the originals...of the tin top cabrio breed".

Despite this lack of acclaim, it has sold well in Britain, being the sixth best selling car overall (and third in the supermini sector) in 2007, with more than 67,000 examples being sold.

Concept cars

207 RCup

At the 2006 Geneva Motor Show Peugeot also unveiled a sporty concept car based on the 207 and badged as the 207 RCup.

Peugeot 207 Epure
The Peugeot 207 Epure was a concept car presented at the Mondial de l'Automobile 2006 designed to preview the 207 CC which followed. The 207 Epure was fitted with a sophisticated hydrogen fuel cell.

Peugeot 207 Super 2000

A Super 2000 version of the Peugeot 207 is used in the Super 2000 World Rally Championship as well as several rally championships across Europe. The 2008 European Rally drivers' champion and the 2007, 2008 and 2009 Intercontinental Rally Challenge drivers' champions drove 207 Super 2000s.

Nameplate use
In several regions including China, South America, Southeast Asia and Iran, a facelifted Peugeot 206 version is marketed under the Peugeot 207 nameplate since November 2008. The model is based on the platform of the predecessor model, the Peugeot 206, and features the front end of the facelifted version 206+, which resembles the Peugeot 207. This name is used on 4-door, 5-door and even on SW model in Mercosur.

Sales and production

See also
 List of rally cars
 Peugeot 206
 Peugeot 208

References

External links

 Official international 207 English website
 Peugeot 207 Coupe Info
 Official UK 207 website

207
Subcompact cars
Euro NCAP superminis
Coupés
Station wagons
Hot hatches
Front-wheel-drive vehicles
Sport compact cars
Hydrogen cars
2010s cars
Cars introduced in 2006
Rally cars